A 1976 marble sculpture of James Madison by Walker Hancock is installed in the James Madison Memorial Building, in Washington, D.C., United States.

See also
 1976 in art
 List of memorials to James Madison
 List of sculptures of presidents of the United States

References

1976 sculptures
Cultural depictions of James Madison
Marble sculptures in Washington, D.C.
Monuments and memorials in Washington, D.C.
Sculptures of men in Washington, D.C.
Statues in Washington, D.C.
Statues of presidents of the United States
Statues of U.S. Founding Fathers